H2B histone family, member M is a protein that in humans is encoded by the H2BFM gene.

References

Further reading